Richard "Rich" Hardbeck is a fictional character from the third generation of the British teen drama Skins. He is portrayed by Alexander Arnold.

Characterisation
Rich, a proud metalhead, is considered to be an outcast in the society in which he lives. He is very cynical, and particularly dislikes people he deems to be trying to "fit in," such as Mini, and he prefers to hang out with other "outcasts," such as Alo and Franky. However, his musical elitism, edgy dress sense and apparent pride is actually a mask to hide his own shyness around girls, among other things. It is only when he is confronted with a girl he likes that this insecurity comes out. As the series progresses, Rich begins to come out of his shell and more open to things he had previously expressed contempt for. This is particularly apparent in his dating Grace, a girl he deems to "represent everything he despises in the world."

Though Rich lives the life of an outcast, this is in sharp contrast to the normal middle-class family he comes from – his father, a low-ranking civil servant, somewhat dismayed by his son's lifestyle, makes many efforts to connect with him. His mother is seen to be fussy and over-protective.

Synopsis
In Franky, Rich and Alo witness Franky's spectacle of an entrance to the school, and immediately see her as a fellow outcast. However, their efforts to get to know her are hindered by the arrival of Queen Bee Mini, to whom Rich has taken an instant dislike, mostly because of her treatment of fellow outcasts. Later, they attempt to get into a party Mini has arranged, but the club bouncer ensures they don't get in - defeating both Rich and Alo at the same time. After being persuaded by Grace, though, Rich and Alo kidnap Franky and take her to a nearby swimming pool, where they bond as a gang of their own.

In Rich, Rich's taste in metal is causing a strain in his friendship with Alo, because he insists on putting on death metal at a party, resulting in them getting thrown out. Alo, fed up that Rich keeps hindering his chances of getting a girlfriend, persuades him to find a girlfriend - though Rich does not like this idea, as he has a particularly specific image of a girl he would like to date, and believes that most of the girls he knows are too shallow for his liking. Luck appears to favour him when he chances upon a fellow metalhead working in the library, but he turns out to be too shy to talk to her. At the suggestion of Franky, Rich turns to Grace as a means of understanding how to interact with girls. Though it does not start well, with Rich causing Grace to pass out from hearing some of his favourite music, Grace, a very good actress, is soon able to switch from her sweet, optimistic nature into the persona of a cynical metalhead just like Rich. He is impressed, but observes that she allows people to walk all over her, especially her friends, to her outrage.

Finally having the confidence to talk to the "Angel of Death" he had seen earlier, he asks her out. But he is dismayed when she turns him down, and shaken when she proves to be just as shallow as the girls Rich despises. Seizing the opportunity, Grace asks him out herself, but he turns her down, causing her to run off crying. Alo remonstrates him for turning down an attractive girl who made the first move, but Rich, stubborn as ever, refuses to compromise on his ideal woman. He goes to his favourite record shop, run by an American named Toxic Bob, and purchases a potentially deadly record. After listening to it, he is rendered tone deaf, and in his fury, he rips up the tickets to a Napalm Death concert he had hoped to attend that night. He attends one of Grace's ballet concerts, and is moved to tears by it. Grace, seeing him in the crowd, is relieved and suggests they go to the Napalm Death concert that night, presenting him with two spare tickets. There, his deafness recedes, and he is motivated to make amends with his father, and purchases some flowers for his mother's birthday - both of which he had earlier spurned. Though Grace cannot start a relationship with him just yet, because she does not want Mini to know she likes him, the two agree to keep in contact.

In Mini, Grace's relationship with Mini collapses, due to Mini's harsh treatment of her and Franky. As a result of this, she is now able to form a relationship with Rich - the two share a brief kiss in the after-show rave following Mini's meltdown.

In Liv, Rich and Grace's relationship, along with Franky's kindness lead to Mini accepting Rich and Alo into the gang. The group spend most of the episode smoking weed at Liv's house.

In Alo, Rich is outraged to discover that Alo's parents intend to drag him out of the school to force him to buckle down on the farm, and drags him to a nearby pub with the gang. When Alo's parents arrive to collect him, Alo gives Rich a heartfelt hug. Later, after Alo's parents act unreasonably, Rich and the gang show up for an eggs and flour fight, followed by a party. There, Grace suggests that they consummate. The next day, Alo shows up at Rich's house, and discovers that he and Grace have been having sex, and he is in such a happy state that Alo cannot bring himself to trouble him with his problem.

In Grace, Grace and Rich wake up in Grace's bed after having spent the night. Grace is horrified that they spent the night at home, and desperately attempts to sneak Rich out. He discovers that Grace's father is David Blood, the arrogant, pushy headmaster of his school. He fails to sneak out when the family dog attacks him, forcing him to call for help. Blood is not impressed with his daughter's boyfriend, and decides that the time has come to move her back to her old school. She eventually persuades him to concede and let her stay on the condition she gets a good mark in her AS drama, which Rich stars in. Secretly, Blood attempts to persuade Rich to deliberately mess up the production by offering to pull some strings to get his father a higher job in the Civil Service. The stress on Grace causes her and Rich to feud. But eventually, Rich defies Blood and performs his role perfectly, shooting Blood a defiant sneer as he does so. It turns out that Blood was lying to his daughter - he intends to send her back to her old boarding school anyway. As she sulks in her bedroom, Rich turns up at her window, serenading her an extract from William Shakespeare's Romeo and Juliet, and tearfully proposes that they marry. She agrees, giving him a quote from The Tempest.

In Everyone, Rich and Grace are preparing to marry, in order to force David Blood to relinquish his control over his daughter. Rich finally has his long hair cut (albeit not with his consent) - it is cut short enough to make him resemble Justin Bieber, causing Alo and Nick to mock him incessantly. The journey to the intended parish where they are scheduled to marry - deliberately chosen for its distance from Bristol, where Blood cannot catch them - doesn't go well, because Alo has not brought a proper map with him, causing to lose his bearings, and he accidentally breaks his van. Grace and Rich manage to hitch a ride from the group and arrive at the church, just too late for their slot. The vicar can offer them one an hour later - giving the group just that long to join them. In case they don't make it, Grace manages to persuade an elderly couple to witness the wedding - as it requires at least two witnesses. Thankfully, the gang all turn up on time. At that moment, Blood arrives and is enraged to discover that he has been given the slip. After being persuaded to calm down by Nick, he grudgingly agrees to let them continue. But Grace and Rich decide against getting married after all, and agree to remain as they are. They then head to a village fete to celebrate their "non-wedding."

References

Skins (British TV series) characters
Fictional English people
Television characters introduced in 2011
Teenage characters in television
British male characters in television